Rick Merlo (born August 5, 1982) is an American water polo player. He was a member of the United States men's national water polo team at the 2008 Beijing Olympics. In the championship game, the USA team won the silver medal, defeated by Hungary.

Merlo was born in Fresno, California.

High school
CIF Champion at Buchanan High School in 1997 and 2000. CIF MVP, First-Team All-American, All-League, and All-CIF in 2000.

College
Merlo attended University of California, Irvine and played water polo under Ted Newland and Marc Hunt.
First-Team All-American, First-Team All-MPSF, and Scholar Athlete in 2005.  ThirdTeam All-American and Second-Team All-MPSF in 2004

Career
Assistant coach at Fresno Pacific University

Personal
Merlo lives currently in Fresno, California.

See also
 List of Olympic medalists in water polo (men)

References

External links
 

1982 births
Living people
American male water polo players
Water polo drivers
Water polo players at the 2008 Summer Olympics
Medalists at the 2008 Summer Olympics
Olympic silver medalists for the United States in water polo